770 Eastern Parkway, also known as "770", is the street address of the World Headquarters of the Chabad-Lubavitch Hasidic movement, located on Eastern Parkway in the Crown Heights section of Brooklyn, New York, in the United States. The building is the center of the Chabad-Lubavitch world movement, and considered by many to be an iconic site in Judaism.

History 

The house, in Collegiate Gothic style, was built in 1920, designed by Edwin Kline, and originally served as a medical office. In 1940, with the assistance of Jacob Rutstein and his son Nathan Rothstein, the building was purchased by Agudas Chasidei Chabad on behalf of the Chabad Lubavitch movement and as a home for Rabbi Yosef Yitzchok Schneersohn when he arrived in the United States in 1940: as Rabbi Schneerson used a wheelchair, a building with an elevator needed to be purchased for his use as both a home and as a synagogue.

During the 1940s, the building, which soon became known as 770, became the hub and central location for Chabad. It served as the main Chabad synagogue, a yeshiva, and offices for the Merkos L'Inyonei Chinuch. Rabbi Yosef Yitzchak Schneersohn lived in an apartment on the second floor. When Rabbi Menachem Mendel Schneersohn arrived from Vichy France to New York in 1941, his father-in-law appointed him as chairman of Merkos L'Inyonei Chinuch. The younger Rabbi Schneerson's office was located on the first floor of 770, near the synagogue.

After Yosef Yitzchok's passing in January 1950, his son-in-law and successor, Menachem Mendel Schneersohn, continued to use his own office on the main floor to lead the movement, while maintaining his personal residence on President Street, several blocks away. Yosef Yitzchok's wife remained resident in her apartment on the second floor until her death. Her two daughters would often visit her in her apartment, and during her lifetime the new Rebbe would conduct semi-private meals there for the family and selected visitors on festive occasions.  Today, the previous Rebbe's apartment and office are closed to the public. Since 1994, Rabbi Menachem Mendel's office on the first floor is used on Shabbat and Jewish holidays as an additional prayer room open to the public during prayer times. 

From its inception the synagogue has served three parallel purposes. It is a place of daily prayer services, a study hall for advanced students, and an assembly hall for Chabad gatherings, known as Farbrengens. Here the Lubavitcher Rebbe or elder Chassidim would address Chassidim and other visitors about Torah observance and Chassidic philosophy and practice.

As the Lubavitch movement grew in the United States, the original synagogue became too small to house the chasidim and students who came to pray and study there. The synagogue was expanded in several stages. The first annex was added in 1960, with subsequent expansions taking place in the late 1960s and again in the mid-1970s. The synagogue then reached its current size. The original synagogue remains as a small study hall used by rabbinical students during the week. In 1988, Rabbi Schneersohn laid the cornerstone for an ongoing renovation project.
The original building is part of a larger block maintained by the Agudas Chasidei Chabad. This block includes the larger synagogue, a Kollel (Kollel Tiferes Zekeinim), and the community's library. It also houses the offices of the secretariat of the Lubavitch Movement and other offices.

770 is an iconic site considered holy by members of the Chabad movement. It attracts thousands of visitors from around the world every year. The building is recognized as an Orthodox Jewish synagogue, which is open to all people, with a men's section on the ground floor and a women's section on the floor above it. On Shabbat and holidays, smaller prayer groups can be found congregating throughout the building, including the lobby and office used by the Rebbe within the original 770 building.

The synagogue's official name is "Congregation Lubavitch of Agudas Chasidei Chabad".

A dispute over the legal ownership of 770 Eastern Parkway resulted in a court decision giving ownership to Merkos L'Inyonei Chinuch and Agudas Chasidei Chabad.

Building

Main Synagogue

The building contains a stairway that leads to the main synagogue. The synagogue is underground, and is considered part of 770, although it technically is mostly under 784 and 788.

Central Lubavitcher Yeshiva

The building contains a Yeshiva with approximately 1000 students. The Yeshiva is a part of a group of Yeshivot called Tomchei Tmimim, started by the 5th Chabad Rebbe Sholom Dovber Schneersohn of Lubavitch.

Replicas
Lubavitch Chassidim attach great significance to everything that played a role in the Rebbe's life; therefore, Lubavitch Chassidim all over the world have built replicas or near-replicas of the building. These include replicas in Ramat Shlomo in Jerusalem and Kfar Chabad in Israel.  UCLA Chabad House at UCLA Los Angeles, California; Chabad House at Rutgers University in New Brunswick, New Jersey; Congregation Ahavat Shalom in Ocean City, Maryland; in Los Angeles, California; in St Kilda East, Victoria, a suburb of Melbourne, Australia; in Milan, Italy; in Brazil; in Argentina; in Chile, in Kamianske, Ukraine; in Camp Gan Israel in Montreal, Quebec and most recently in Baltimore, Maryland.

Tzedakah boxes and Mezuzah cases have been decorated with pictures of the building. Joseph Zakon Wineries in New York City makes a wine called "Seven-seventy". In the early 1990s, Chabad bar-mitzvah boys began using tefillin bags with an embroidered picture of seven-seventy.

References 

 

Chabad in the United States
Hasidic Judaism in New York City
Menachem Mendel Schneerson
Orthodox synagogues in New York City
Synagogues in Brooklyn
Yosef Yitzchak Schneersohn
Crown Heights, Brooklyn
Chabad yeshivas
Yiddish culture in New York City
it:Chabad Lubavitch#Successione